Distatrix is a genus of parasitoid wasps in the family Braconidae. There are more than 30 described species in Distatrix, found throughout most of the world.

Species
These 33 species belong to the genus Distatrix:

 Distatrix anthedon (Nixon, 1965)
 Distatrix antirrheae Whitfield & Grinter, 2009
 Distatrix belliger (Wilkinson, 1929)
 Distatrix carolinae Fernández-Triana, 2010
 Distatrix cerales (Nixon, 1965)
 Distatrix cuspidalis (de Saeger, 1944)
 Distatrix euproctidis (Ullyett, 1946)
 Distatrix flava (Fernandez-Triana & van Achterberg, 2017)
 Distatrix formosa (Wesmael, 1837)
 Distatrix geometrivora (de Saeger, 1944)
 Distatrix gratiosa (Wilkinson, 1930)
 Distatrix iglesiasi (Viereck, 1913)
 Distatrix iraklii (Kotenko, 1986)
 Distatrix loretta Grinter, 2009
 Distatrix maia (Nixon, 1965)
 Distatrix malloi (Blanchard, 1942)
 Distatrix pallidocinctus (Gahan, 1918)
 Distatrix pandora Grinter, 2019
 Distatrix papilionis (Viereck, 1912)
 Distatrix pitillaensis Grinter, 2009
 Distatrix pompelon (Nixon, 1965)
 Distatrix sancus (Nixon, 1965)
 Distatrix simulissima (de Saeger, 1944)
 Distatrix solanae Whitfield, 1996
 Distatrix teapae (Nixon, 1965)
 Distatrix tookei (Shenefelt, 1972)
 Distatrix tormina (Nixon, 1965)
 Distatrix ugandaensis (Gahan, 1918)
 Distatrix vigilis Grinter, 2009
 Distatrix xanadon Grinter, 2009
 Distatrix yemenitica van Achterberg & Fernandez-Triana, 2017
 Distatrix yunae Rousse & Gupta, 2013

References

Further reading

 
 
 

Microgastrinae
Braconidae genera